Mali Nerajec is a small settlement south of Dragatuš in the Municipality of Črnomelj in the White Carniola area of southeastern Slovenia. The area is part of the traditional region of Lower Carniola and is now included in the Southeast Slovenia Statistical Region.

References

External links
Mali Nerajec on Geopedia

Populated places in the Municipality of Črnomelj